'23 was the second edition of Pesma za Evroviziju, Serbia's national final organised by Radio Television of Serbia (RTS) to select the Serbian entry for the Eurovision Song Contest 2023. The selection consisted of two semi-finals held on 1 and 2 March 2023, respectively, and a final on 4 March 2023. The three shows were broadcast on RTS1, RTS Svet and RTS Planeta as well as streamed online via the broadcaster's website rts.rs and the broadcaster's Eurovision dedicated Youtube channel.

Format 

In 2023, RTS decided to once again organize Pesma za Evroviziju to decide its representative at the Eurovision Song Contest 2023. On the same day as the submission window had opened, the rulebook was published. The selection consisted of two semi-finals, held on 1 and 2 March, and a final on 4 March 2023.

Voting 

In all 3 shows, the jury and the televoting award one set of 12, 10 & 8–1 points each to their 10 favourite entries. Eight entries that scored the most points in each semi-final progressed to the final. The act with the most points in the final is declared the winner.

Hosts 

Competing entries 
The submission window for competing entries opened on the 1st of September 2022, and was due to close on the 15th of November the same year, but was later pushed back to the 1st of December. Artists were required to be Serbian citizens and submit entries in one of the official languages of the Republic of Serbia, while songwriters of any nationality were allowed to submit songs. At the closing of the deadline, 200 submissions were received.

A selection committee consisting of RTS music editors reviewed the submissions and selected 32 entries to proceed to the national final. The selected competing entries were announced on 9 January 2023 and among the competing artists are Tijana Dapčević, who represented Macedonia in the Eurovision Song Contest 2014, and Hurricane (albeit with a different line-up), which represented Serbia in the Eurovision Song Contest 2020 and 2021.

Shows

Semi-finals 
The two semi-finals took place at the Studios 8 and 9 of RTS in Košutnjak, Belgrade on 1 and 2 March 2023.

Semi-final 1 
In addition to the competing entries, former Eurovision contestant Konstrakta, who represented Serbia in 2022, was featured as the guest performer in the first semi-final.

Semi-final 2 

Final 
The final took place at the Studios 8 and 9 of RTS in Košutnjak, Belgrade on 4 March 2023 and featured the 16 qualifiers from the preceding two semi-finals. All funds collected from the viewer votes were donated to charity for the purchase of equipment for the Health Center in the municipality of Bojnik. The show was opened by a rendition of the British Eurovision Song Contest 1981 winning entry "Making Your Mind Up" by the four hosts, while the interval act featured a medley of songs by the Beatles to honour the hosting of the Eurovision Song Contest 2023 in Liverpool, performed by singers Dejan Cukić, Gordan Kičić, Iva Lorens, Oliver Nektarijević and Srđan Gojković as well as the tribute band The Bestbeat.

Other awards

OGAE Serbia Award 

OGAE Serbia Award for the best song on Pesma za Evroviziju '23 is voted on by the association members. The award was won by the winning song "" with 275 points. In second place, with 262 points, was "" by Filip Baloš, while the third place went to Zejna and her song "" with 174 points.

Baloš was also the designated as the Serbian entrant to the OGAE Second Chance Contest.

Broadcasts 
The three shows were broadcast on RTS1, RTS Svet and RTS Planeta as well as streamed online via the broadcaster's website rts.rs, and the broadcaster's Eurovision dedicated Youtube channel.

Notes

References 

2023 in Serbia
2023 song contests